Hillsboro Pines is a census-designated place (CDP) in Broward County, Florida, United States. The population was 446 at the 2010 census.

Geography
Hillsboro Pines is located at  (26.326606, -80.196317).

According to the United States Census Bureau, the CDP has a total area of 0.6 km2 (0.2 mi2), all land.

Demographics

As of the census of 2000, there were 406 people, 145 households, and 118 families living in the CDP.  The population density was 712.5/km2 (1,810.0/mi2).  There were 147 housing units at an average density of 258.0/km2 (655.3/mi2).  The racial makeup of the CDP was 94.83% White (91.6% were Non-Hispanic White,) 2.22% African American, 0.49% Asian, 0.99% Pacific Islander, 0.99% from other races, and 0.49% from two or more races. Hispanic or Latino of any race were 4.68% of the population.

There were 145 households, out of which 38.6% had children under the age of 18 living with them, 69.0% were married couples living together, 6.2% had a female householder with no husband present, and 18.6% were non-families. 13.8% of all households were made up of individuals, and 2.1% had someone living alone who was 65 years of age or older.  The average household size was 2.80 and the average family size was 2.99.

In the CDP, the population was spread out, with 24.1% under the age of 18, 5.7% from 18 to 24, 39.2% from 25 to 44, 24.4% from 45 to 64, and 6.7% who were 65 years of age or older.  The median age was 37 years. For every 100 females, there were 107.1 males.  For every 100 females age 18 and over, there were 108.1 males.

The median income for a household in the CDP was $70,938, and the median income for a family was $70,313. Males had a median income of $45,458 versus $25,819 for females. The per capita income for the CDP was $32,908.  None of the families and 1.6% of the population were living below the poverty line, including no under eighteens and none of those over 64.

As of 2000, English was the first language for 100% of the population.

References

Census-designated places in Broward County, Florida
Census-designated places in Florida